The lac aux Écorces (English: bark lake) is a freshwater body crossed by the Rivière aux Écorces, in the unorganized territory of Lac-Jacques-Cartier, in the La Côte-de-Beaupré Regional County Municipality, in the administrative region of Capitale-Nationale, in the province from Quebec, to Canada. Lac aux Écorces is part of the Laurentides Wildlife Reserve.

The area around the lake is served indirectly by the route 169 (connecting Quebec (city) to Alma) and by the route 155 (connecting La Tuque and Chambord). Some secondary forest roads serve this area for forestry and recreational tourism activities.

Forestry is the main economic activity in the sector; recreational tourism, second.

The surface of Lac aux Écorces is usually frozen from the beginning of December to the end of March, however the safe circulation on the ice is generally from mid-December to mid-March.

Geography 
The main watersheds near Lac aux Écorces are:
 north side: rivière aux Écorces, Sawine River, lac de la Belle Rivière, Kenogami Lake;
 east side: Lac à la Culotte, Trompeuse River, rivière aux Canots, Apica River, Pikauba River;
 south side: rivière aux Écorces, Samson Lake, Corneillier Lake, Métabetchouane East River;
 west side: Lac aux Montagnais, Métascouac Lake, Métabetchouane River.

Lac aux Écorces turns out to be a widening of the rivière aux Écorces.

This lake is mainly fed by the Pikauba River which crosses this lake towards the northeast, by riparian streams, by the outlet (coming from the east) of Labelle lake, by the outlet (coming from the north) from lakes to Culotte and Bina, Salvail stream (coming from the east) and the outlet (coming from the west) from Tréteau lake. The mouth of Lac aux Écorces is located to the north, at:
  north of Croche stream;
  south of the mouth of the rivière aux Canots;
  west of the mouth of Lake Harvey which is the head lake of the Trompeuse River;
  south-west of route 169;
  south-west of the ex-hamlet of Mont-Apica;
  south of the confluence of the Pikauba River and Kenogami Lake.

From the mouth of Lac aux Écorces, the current follows the course of:
 the rivière aux Écorces on  generally towards the northeast;
 the Pikauba River on  generally towards the northeast;
 the Kenogami Lake on  towards the northeast to barrage de Portage-des-Roches;
 the Saguenay River on  eastward to Tadoussac where it merges with the Saint Lawrence estuary.

Toponymy 
The toponym lac aux Écorces was formalized on December 5, 1968, by the Commission de toponymie du Québec.

See also 
 St. Lawrence River
 List of lakes of Canada

References 

Lakes of Capitale-Nationale
La Côte-de-Beaupré Regional County Municipality
Laurentides Wildlife Reserve